János Dalmati (26 February 1942 – 29 September 2020) was a Hungarian racewalker. He competed in the men's 50 kilometres walk at the 1972 Summer Olympics.

References

External links
 

1942 births
2020 deaths
Athletes (track and field) at the 1972 Summer Olympics
Hungarian male racewalkers
Olympic athletes of Hungary
Place of birth missing